This list of islands of the Kalix archipelago includes the many islands, large and small, in the Swedish Kalix archipelago in the north of the Bothnian Bay.
They are part of the larger archipelago that encompasses islands around the northern end of the bay.
Islands in Kalix archipelago include:

 Ajaxarna 
 Algrundet 
 Alholmarna 
 Alholmen 
 Almansgrundet 
 Ankargrynnan 
 Bastagrundet 
 Berghamn 
 Berghamnklippan 
 Bergnäsgrunden 
 Bergön 
 Bettnäsgrundet 
 Binnören 
 Binnörgrynnan 
 Björkgrundet 
 Björkholmen 
 Björn 
 Björnholmsgrynnan 
 Björngrundet 
 Björnrevet 
 Blackgrundet 
 Blåhällan 
 Bockön 
 Bodskatagrynnan 
 Bodögrönnan 
 Bodörsreven 
 Bodöskären 
 Bredskäret 
 Börstholmsgrunden 
 Börstskärsbådan 
 Börstskärsgrundet 
 Dagbrotten 
 Djupbäcksholmen 
 Djupvarpsgrynnan 
 Dockholmen 
 Enagrundet 
 Enholmen 
 Enrisgrundet 
 Eriksören 
 Erikören
 Finskören 
 Fjuksholmen 
 Fjuksholmsgrundet 
 Fjärdsgrundet, east 
 Fjärdsgrundet, west 
 Flaragrynnorna 
 Flockgrundet 
 Flottgrundet 
 Frevisören 
 Furuholmen 
 Furuholmen, Sangis 
 Furuholmsgrunden 
 Fälesön-Lägenön 
 Fårögrundet 
 Följet 
 Gammalhusgrundet 
 Gammalhusgrynnorna 
 Getholmen 
 Getskär 
 Granholmen 
 Granön-Börstskäret 
 Granskatagrunden 
 Granskäret 
 Grisselholmen 
 Grundet 
 Gräddmanshällorna 
 Gräddören 
 Gräsgrynnan 
 Gräsören 
 Gårdgrönnan 
 Gåsören 
 Halsögrundet 
 Halsön 
 Hamnholmen 
 Haragrunden 
 Hastaskäret 
 Hastaskärsgrundet 
 Humlan 
 Huvögrunden 
 Häggholmen 
 Hällgrundet 
 Hällhamskatagrynnorna 
 Hällholmen, Kalix east 
 Hällholmen, Kalix west 
 Hällskäret 
 Hönsungen 
 Hönsunggrundet 
 Innerstgrundet 
 Inre Grönnan 
 Kallskäret 
 Kallvikskäret 
 Kalvgrunden 
 Kastören 
 Kattholmen 
 Kattholmsgrynnorna 
 Kaxen 
 Klingergundet 
 Korpholmen 
 Korpholmgrynnan 
 Korsgrundet-Vattungen 
 Kringelön 
 Kuggen 
 Kuggrynnan 
 Kullmössan 
 Kungsörarna 
 Kusen 
 Kvarnörbådan 
 Kvarnören 
 Kyrkgrundet 
 Lappören 
 Ligogrunnan 
 Likskär 
 Likskärsgrynnan 
 Likskärshällan 
 Likskärsrevet 
 Lillbådan 
 Lillfårögrynnan 
 Lillfåröholmen 
 Lillvarpgrundet 
 Lillögrundet 
 Lill-Fårön 
 Lill Bergholmen 
 Lill-Jakobgrund 
 Lill Skabben 
 Lilla Gubben 
 Lilla Gumman 
 Lilla Huvön 
 Lilla Sonaholmen 
 Lilla Trutskär 
 Lillholmen 
 Lutskärsgrynnan 
 Lägenö-Furuholmen 
 Lägenön, west 
 Lång-Lövgrundet 
 Långgrundet, east 
 Långgrundet, west 
 Långgrynnan 
 Långören-Rossören 
 Långskärsgrunden 
 Lövgrundet 
 Malgrundet 
 Malungsgrundet 
 Malungsgrynnan 
 Malören 
 Massan 
 Matsgrundet 
 Mellanbrottet 
 Mellangubben 
 Mellangrundsbotten 
 Mellerstskäret 
 Mittigrundet, east 
 Mittigrundet, west 
 Mitti Holsterören 
 Norra Gammelgrundet 
 Notörsgrundet 
 Nygrundet 
 Nygrynnan 
 Nässkatagrundet 
 Nätigrundet 
 Näverön 
 Ollgrundet 
 Olnilsbrottet
 Ol-Knuts 
 Ornskäret 
 Orrskärsgrundet 
 Orrskärsrevet 
 Oxören 
 Per-Jönsagrynnan 
 Portstenen 
 Pölgrynnan 
 Renen 
 Repskäret 
 Repskärsbådan 
 Repskärsgrundet 
 Repskärssten 
 Revelholmen 
 Risholmen 
 Risön-Ångören 
 Rågholmen 
 Rånön 
 Rödhällgrundet 
 Rönnören 
 Sissan 
 Sjugranagrynnan 
 Skabbgrunden 
 Skagsgrunden 
 Skags-Furuholmen 
 Skarven 
 Skirgrundet 
 Skogören 
 Skränmåsören 
 Skötholmen-Lövholmen 
 Slätbådan 
 Sonaholmsgrundet 
 Splitterören 
 Stabbsandsgrundet 
 Starrgrynnan 
 Stenen 
 Stengrund 
 Stor Bergholmen 
 Stor-Fårön 
 Stor-Granholmen 
 Stora Huvön 
 Stor-Jakobgrund 
 Stora Gubben 
 Stora Gumman 
 Stora-Rågholmgrundet 
 Stora Sonaholmen 
 Stora Trutskär 
 Storbrottet 
 Storbådan 
 Storfårögrynnan 
 Storören 
 Stridsgrynnan 
 Strömsgrundet 
 Ströstenarna 
 Svallgrundet 
 Svartgrundet 
 Svarten 
 Svartholmen, east 
 Svartholmen, west 
 Svartholmsgrynnan 
 Svarthällan 
 Svartskatahällan 
 Svartskäret 
 Sydhällsgrynnan 
 Sälgrönnan 
 Södra Gammelgrundet 
 Sören-Långören 
 Tallholmen 
 Tappermann 
 Tjärugrundet 
 Tjäruskäret 
 Tomten 
 Tregränagrundet 
 Trollen 
 Troppören 
 Trutbådan 
 Truten 
 Trutgrynnan 
 Trutskär 
 Trutskärsgrynnan 
 Träffen 
 Tunnskär 
 Tunnskärshällorna 
 Tärnören 
 Vaktgrynnan 
 Vattengrynnan 
 Vattungen 
 Vibbgrundet 
 Vitgrundet 
 Vitgrundet, Lägenön 
 Västerst Holsterören 
 Vånafjärdsgrynnan 
 Yrstenen 
 Ytterstlandet 
 Yttregrundet 
 Yttre Sandgrundet 
 Yttre Västantillgrundet 
 Åsenholmen 
 Örarna

See also
List of islands of Bothnian Bay

References

Kalix
Kalix
Kalix
Kalix